The 1993–94 Marquette Warriors men's basketball team represented the Marquette University in the 1993–94 season. The Warriors, coached by Kevin O’Neill, were then a member of Great Midwest Conference.

The Warriors were invited to participate in the 1994 NCAA tournament, where Marquette advanced to the Sweet Sixteen for the first time since 1977.

The 1993-94 season was the last in which Marquette went by the nickname "Warriors." Toward the end of the end of the 1993–94 academic year, the school decided to change the nickname for their sports teams to "Golden Eagles" effective the following school year.

Roster

Schedule

Team players drafted into the NBA

References 

Marquette
Marquette Golden Eagles men's basketball seasons
Marquette
Marquette
Marquette